Gurdim (also Romanized as Gūrdīm; also known as Gordīm, Gūdīm, and Kūrdīm) is a village in Kahir Rural District, in the Central District of Konarak County, Sistan and Baluchestan Province, Iran. At the 2006 census, its population was 127, in 20 families.

References 

Populated places in Konarak County